Unclaimed is a 2013 documentary.

Unclaimed may also refer to:*
Unclaimed (2016 film), a TV film
The Unclaimed, a project under which a 1967 single was released by Milan the Leather Boy
Lost, mislaid, and abandoned property, also known as unclaimed property
Terra nullius, also known as unclaimed territory